Mini Metro or MiniMetro may refer to:
 Mini Metro (video game), a puzzle strategy video game
 MiniMetro, a family of cable propelled automated people mover systems built by Poma/Leitner Group
 Austin Metro, a supermini economy car launched as the miniMetro
 A term used for segregated Light rail systems.